Green Bay is a locality in the community of Kingston, Prince Edward Island. Green Bay falls inside the subdivision of Lot 30.

The settlement of Green Bay was created December 12, 1939. Green Bay was changed to a locality when it became a part of the community of Kingston in 1974.

References 

Communities in Queens County, Prince Edward Island